Perirehaedulus richardsi is a species of trilobites named after British musician Keith Richards.

See also
Aegrotocatellus jaggeri - a species of trilobite named after Mick Jagger
Anomphalus jaggerius  - a species of snail named after Jagger
Jaggermeryx naida, extinct species of semiaquatic anthracothere after Jagger
List of organisms named after famous people (born 1900–1949)

References

Encrinuridae
Fossil taxa described in 1995
Keith Richards